The Philippine presidential line of succession defines who becomes or acts as president upon the incapacity, death, resignation, or removal from office (by impeachment and subsequent disqualification) of a sitting president or a president-elect.

Current order 
 
The current presidential line of succession to the office of the president of the Philippines is specified by the 1987 Constitution. The line of presidential succession follows the order of: vice president, president of the Senate and speaker of the House of Representatives. In case of death, permanent disability, or inability of these officials, Congress shall, by law, provide for the manner of selection of the person who is to act as president until a president or vice president shall have qualified and the line of succession will change of who those new national officials are.

Contrary to popular belief, the presidential line of succession does not include the chief justice.

Current line of succession

Constitutional provisions

Historical provisions

1973–1984 

Under the 1973 constitution, the executive committee led by the prime minister was to exercise the powers and discharge the duties of the president, if the president-elect had died, failed to qualify, or if the president had not have been chosen. If the Batasang Pambansa, the national legislature, withdraws confidence in the prime minister, the legislature's speaker would have presided over the executive committee. In an absence of an executive committee, the Batasang Pambansa speaker would be acting president until a new president was elected or qualified. If the presidency was vacated with more than 18 months left in the term of the previous president, the Batasang Pambansa was obliged to organize a special election, with the elected president to serve the unexpired term of their predecessor.

The executive committee was created under the said constitution, which should have at most 14 members and at least half of which should be Assemblymen. The executive committee assists the president in fulfilling their executive function.

There was uncertainty regarding the presidential line of succession during the later years of the presidency of Ferdinand Marcos, particularly in the 1980s. It is implied that the member who was deemed the best performing would be Marcos' successor whose health is already deteriorating. The failing economy at that time also called for the clarity on who exactly would succeed Marcos. In 1983, President Marcos announced who ever was prime minister at the time the presidency becomes vacant would succeed him. Among those who were considered as candidates to succeed Marcos are Prime Minister Cesar Virata who was chairman of the committee, and Imelda Marcos who is also a committee member, Marcos' wife and the first lady. A member of the committee, Emmanuel Pelaez lobbied for a constitutional amendment which would allow Prime Minister Virata to assume as acting president in an event Marcos vacates the presidency while Assemblyman Arturo Tolentino campaigned for the restoration of the post of vice president.

1984–1987 
Another plebiscite was held in 1984 which restored the position of vice president, as well as restoring the holder of the position as the first in line in the presidential succession. A vice president should have been elected in a scheduled national elections in 1987, which was never held because President Marcos announced snap elections in 1985. The ratified provisions of the 1984 plebiscite also obliged the speaker of the Batasang Pambansa to act as acting president should the presidency be vacated prior to the scheduled 1987 elections. Corazon Aquino was installed as president when President Ferdinand Marcos was removed from office in the People Power Revolution of 1986.

Current provisions
The following are the provisions for the Philippine presidential line of succession of the current Constitution of the Philippines adopted in 1987.

Prior to the start of the term 
If a president was elected but failed to qualify, the vice president who was elected will act as president until the president qualifies
If there was no president elected, the vice president who was elected will act as president until a president is elected and qualifies
If at the beginning of the term of the president, the president-elect dies or has become permanently disabled, the vice president who was elected becomes president
If neither a president nor a vice president had been chosen or had qualified, or if both had died or had become permanently disabled, the president of the Senate or, in case of their inability, the speaker of the House of Representatives, will act as president until a president or a vice president is chosen and qualifies.

During the term 
If the president dies, becomes permanently disabled, is removed from office, or resigns, the vice president becomes the president and serves the unexpired term
If both the president and the vice president die, become permanently disabled, are removed from office, or resign, the president of the Senate or, in case of their inability, the speaker of the House of Representatives, will act as president until a president or vice president is elected and qualifies
If the acting president dies, becomes permanently disabled, is removed from office, or resigns, Congress shall, by law, provide who shall serve as president. They shall serve until the president or the vice president shall have been elected and qualified, and be subject to the same restrictions of powers and disqualifications as the acting president

Succession in practice 

On August 1, 1944, following the death of President Manuel L. Quezon due to tuberculosis, Vice President Sergio Osmeña took his oath of office and became the second president of the Commonwealth of the Philippines, then a government-in-exile in the United States. As the war in the Pacific Theatre continued, he returned to the Philippines two months later with General Douglas MacArthur and began the campaign to liberate the country. After the war, he restored the Commonwealth government and the various executive departments. Osmeña, who assumed the presidency at age 65, lost to Manuel Roxas in his bid for a full four-year term in his own right in the 1946 presidential election.
On April 17, 1948, Vice President Elpidio Quirino assumed the presidency, taking his oath of office two days after the death of Manuel Roxas. His first official act as the president was the proclamation of a state of mourning throughout the country for Roxas' death. Since Quirino was a widower, his surviving daughter Victoria Quirino served as the official hostess and performed the functions traditionally ascribed to the first lady. Quirino won the 1949 presidential election and secured a four-year term in his own right.
On March 17, 1957, Vice President Carlos P. Garcia was heading the Philippine delegation to the Southeast Asia Treaty Organization conference, then being held at Canberra, Australia. Vice President Garcia hastily traveled back to Manila when he was informed of the death of President Ramon Magsaysay in a plane crash in Cebu. Upon his arrival, he immediately returned to Malacañang Palace to assume the duties of President. Supreme Court Chief Justice Ricardo Paras was at hand to administer the oath of office and Garcia became the 8th president of the Philippines. President Garcia's first actions dealt with the declaration of a period of mourning for the whole nation and the burial of his late predecessor. Garcia was elected to a full four-year term in the 1957 presidential election, which was held a few months after Magsaysay's death.
On January 20, 2001, Vice President Gloria Macapagal Arroyo took her oath of office as the 14th president of the Philippines before Chief Justice Hilario Davide Jr. following the ouster of President Joseph Estrada. She had earlier resigned her cabinet position as Secretary of Social Welfare and Development and joined the growing opposition to the president, who faced impeachment. Estrada was forced from office by the EDSA Revolution of 2001. She was elected to a full six-year term in the 2004 presidential election and was sworn in on June 30, 2004. Following her presidency, she was elected to the House of Representatives, making her the second Philippine president after Jose P. Laurel to pursue a lower office after their presidency.

Proposed amendments 
2018: In line with President Rodrigo Duterte's campaign for the adoption of a federal system of government in the Philippines, the presidential line of succession has been a subject of debate within the House of Representatives in the creation of a draft federal charter. A version of the draft proposed that the Senate president to be next in line in the presidential succession ahead of the vice president in an event Duterte would be unable to perform his duties as president during the transition period to federal form of government. House constitutional amendments panel chairperson Vicente Veloso justified the provision as a means to avert political instability due to the ongoing electoral protest filed by losing candidate Bongbong Marcos against Vice President Leni Robredo at the time. The provision was criticized by Robredo herself who characterized the move as "too desperate".
2019: Senator Panfilo Lacson filed a bill that would expand the presidential line of succession which included a "designated survivor" clause. In addition to the vice president, the Senate president, and the House speaker, Lacson proposed that the next set of officials in the line of succession would be as follows: the most senior senator, based on the length of service in the Senate; the most senior representative, based on the length of service in the House of Representatives; and a member of the Cabinet designated by the president. The measure was filed as a contingency in an event that the president, and the three named officials in the presidential line of succession all died or rendered incapacitated such as a hypothetical terrorist attack during a State of the Nation Address.

References

 Line of succession
Government of the Philippines